{
  "type": "ExternalData",
  "service": "geoshape",
  "ids": "Q2611322",
  "title": "Pulau Tekong"
}

Pulau Tekong, also known colloquially as Tekong or Tekong Island, is the second-largest of Singapore's outlying islands after Jurong Island. Tekong is located off Singapore's northeastern coast, east of Pulau Ubin. Since the 1990s, the island has been used by the Singapore Armed Forces (SAF) and is generally restricted from public access. Transport to the island for permitted persons is via the SAF Changi Ferry Terminal at Changi Beach.

The original  island has undergone extensive land reclamation works for military use on its southern and northwestern coasts subsuming many of its surrounding small islets, including the former  Pulau Tekong Kechil (Small Tekong Island).

Etymology
Pulau Tekong appears in the Franklin and Jackson's 1828 map as Po. Tukang. The early name could have arisen because the island served as a trading station for both residents of Pulau Ubin and the state of Johor. Tukang means merchants in this case.

Tekong means "an obstacle", so-called because the island blocks the mouth of the Sungai Johor. Pulo Tekong Besar came under the Changi district, and the island had a sizeable population, being the largest island off Singapore and two miles from Fairy Point. Ferries plied from the pier at that point and the island daily. After 1920, it was mostly known for its rubber plantations.

History

Civilian era
The island was once home to 5000 inhabitants, the last of which moved out in 1987. 60 percent of the inhabitants were Chinese, out of which 70 percent were Hakkas and 30 percent were Teochews, and 40 percent were Malays. There were a few Indians as well.

The reason for Hakka being the majority of the Chinese population is that most of the Hokkien and Teochew businessmen already had flourishing businesses on the mainland. When the Hakkas arrived, they decided to make a living on an island less inhabited. Most were farmers, fishermen and shop owners selling sundry goods.

Wild pigs and deer were once plentiful on Pulau Tekong, and attracted hunters from Singapore. Pulo Tekong Besar had undergone so much development after World War II, with vegetable, fruit and poultry farms, that the wildlife has mostly disappeared.

Military era
The Singapore Zoo worked with the Malaysian Wildlife Department's Elephant Capture and Translocation Unit to help in its plan to recapture the runaway elephants. On 10 June, all three elephants were captured and relocated back to the jungles of Johor.

In March 2004, Pulau Tekong was the hiding place for a group of armed robbers comprising two Indonesians and a Malaysian. The robbers had fled from Malaysia, sparking off a massive coordinated manhunt involving Air Force helicopters, commandos, ground surveillance radar, troops from the 2nd Singapore Infantry Regiment, troops from the 40th Singapore Armoured Regiment and the Singapore Police Force. All three were caught by police officers; two by members of the Gurkha Contingent and one by the Police Coast Guard's Special Task Squadron. They were later charged with illegal entry and possession of firearms.

On 25 September 2006, the Combat Engineers of Singapore Armed Forces handed over a new field camp, Sanyongkong Field Camp, named after a depopulated village Kampong Sanyongkong, after a year of construction. The field camp would allow for longer training periods without returning to mainland Singapore.

Land reclamation work is currently undergoing off the southern part of the island, with works on the northwestern coasts having been largely completed as of 2022. In contrast to other land reclamation works at other parts of the country, Singapore has been using the polder method to create new land for Pulau Tekong.

Current usage 
 
Pulau Tekong is used exclusively as a training base for the Singapore Army. Pulau Tekong Besar is one of the islands that is a training base for the various Singapore Army with other islands, including Pulau Sudong, Pulau Pawai and Pulau Senang.

The Basic Military Training Centre is based here, where recruits to the Singapore Army are trained in basic military operations. The School of Infantry Specialists (SISPEC) was formerly situated at Rocky Hill Camp. A new training area, called Sanyongkong Field Camp, has been completed on the reclaimed land south of Dogra Bridge. Built by the Combat Engineers, this field camp will be used to train Infantry and Guards battalions.

It also provides habitat to some wild animals that are rarely seen in the main island of Singapore, such as the leopard cat, Sunda slow loris and Sunda pangolin. The extended Pulau Tekong will massively replace all training grounds, like Mandai, Marsiling, Seletar, Nee Soon, Lower Seletar, Upper Thomson and Simpang. 

The island also houses Singapore's second hot spring, Pulau Tekong Hot Spring in the former grounds of Kampung Unum.

Coastal protection
The National Biodiversity Centre (NBC) and National Parks Board (NParks) has conducted coastal protection and restoration works at the north-eastern coastline of Pulau Tekong to prevent further coastal erosion. The NBC stated that the erosion had resulted from extensive movements of ships and strong waves in the area. A study NParks commissioned in 2006 found that  of the north-eastern shore is most severely affected. 

Local ecologists point out that the island is extremely rich in biodiversity and resident to some rare or endangered species, including the Fern Dipteris conjugata.

In popular culture
 In Singaporean folklore, the island is deemed to be extremely haunted. 
 The Singapore Broadcasting Corporation (now Mediacorp) Channel 8 drama "Son of Pulau Tekong (亚答籽)" portrayed the lives of the inhabitants of Pulau Tekong before it was turned into a training area for the Singapore Armed Forces. It is unclear whether the folklore actually dates back to the days when Tekong was inhabited by civilians, or the beliefs sprang up after the island was taken over as military territory.

Notes

References

Works cited
Victor R Savage, Brenda S A Yeoh (2003), Toponymics - A Study of Singapore Street Names, Eastern Universities Press,

External links 

Satellite image of Pulau Tekong - Google Maps
URA Concept Plan 2001

 
Tekong
North-Eastern Islands
Hakka culture in Singapore